McGeer is a surname. Notable people with the surname include:

Allison McGeer (born 1953), Canadian infectious diseases specialist
Edith Graef McGeer (born 1923), American neuroscientist
Gerry McGeer (1888–1947), Canadian lawyer and politician
Manfred McGeer (1893–1955), Canadian politician
Pat McGeer (1927–2022), Canadian physician and basketball player

See also
John McGeer House, a historic house in New York, United States